Anastasija Grigorjeva (born 12 May 1990) is a Latvian freestyle wrestler, who won gold at the 2010, 2013 and 2016 European Championships.  She has also won two bronze medals at World Championship level and won gold at the European Games.  She has competed at three Olympics (2012, 2016 and 2020).

Career 
Grigorjeva was born in Daugavpils, Latvia.

She started to train in wrestling from the year 2003. She originally trained in judo before switching to freestyle wrestling some years later. She studied at the University of Daugavpils from 2012 onwards.

Grigorjeva had sporting success from a young age: she was the silver medalist at the European Championship for cadets in 2007, the winner of the European Championship for juniors in 2008 and silver medalist of the World and European Championship for juniors.

She won European Championships 2010 (Women's freestyle – 55 kg) and won silver in 2012 (Women's freestyle – 59 kg).

She qualified for the 2012 Summer Olympics in London.  At these Games, she exited in the quarterfinals and achieved 9th place.  After the 2012 Olympic Games she competed successfully in tournaments, winning 16 consecutive victories, the third longest series of victory between FILA elite wrestlers.

In 2013 she won the title of European Champion for a second time, this time in the -63 kg weight category and she was named the sportswoman of the year in Latvia. By March 2014 she was number 1 ranked in the world, and in April she won her third gold medal at the European Championship. That year, Grigorjeva won a bronze medal at the World Championship. In 2014 she was again named Latvian sportswoman of the year.

In June 2015, she competed in the inaugural European Games, for Latvia in wrestling in the women's freestyle -63 kg division. She earned a bronze medal.

She qualified for the 2016 Summer Olympics, but was again knocked out in the quarterfinals.  This time she was entered into the bronze medal repechage, but lost to eventual bronze medalist Monika Michalik.

In 2020, she won the silver medal in the women's 62 kg event at the 2020 Individual Wrestling World Cup held in Belgrade, Serbia. In March 2021, she qualified at the European Qualification Tournament to compete at the 2020 Summer Olympics in Tokyo, Japan. She lost her bronze medal match in the women's freestyle 62 kg event.

References

External links
 
 
 
 
  

1990 births
Sportspeople from Daugavpils
Latvian female sport wrestlers
Living people
Wrestlers at the 2012 Summer Olympics
Wrestlers at the 2016 Summer Olympics
Wrestlers at the 2020 Summer Olympics
Olympic wrestlers of Latvia
European Games bronze medalists for Latvia
Wrestlers at the 2015 European Games
Wrestlers at the 2019 European Games
European Games medalists in wrestling
European Games gold medalists for Latvia
World Wrestling Championships medalists
University of Daugavpils alumni
European Wrestling Championships medalists
20th-century Latvian women
21st-century Latvian women